Canyon Songs is the fourth full-length studio album by Tony Lucca released on August 8, 2006.

Album information
This album marks the second album Lucca released with his record label, Rock Ridge Music. The album was almost entirely written and recorded by Tony Lucca in the canyons of the Hollywood Hills.

Track listing
All songs written by Tony Lucca, except "Sarah Jane", co-written by Cole Garlak.
"Death Of Me" – 2:58
"Darlin' I" – 3:50
"Longing" – 3:18
"Sarah Jane" – 3:49
"The Hustler, The Widow, And The Boy From Detroit" – 4:00
"Songbird" – 4:41
"So Long" – 4:50
"Julia" – 3:44
"Feels Like Love" – 3:19
"Around The Bend" – 4:36

Personnel
 Stevie Blacke – Violin, Cello
 Russell Cook – Engineer, Mixing
 Brandy Flower – Design
 Robin Giles – Vocals (background)
 Chasen Hampton – Vocals
 Tim Hatfield – Producer, Engineer, Overdubs, Mixing,  (Sara Jane)
 Tim Jones – Vocals (background)
 Josh Kelley – Engineer, Shaker
 Ann Klein – Pedal Steel, Guitar (Electric)
 Tony Lucca – Guitar (Acoustic), Bass, Guitar (Electric), Vocals, Vocals (background), Producer, Guitar (Classical), Shaker, Wurlitzer
 Ben Peeler – Pedal Steel
 Dan Shike – Mastering
 Todd Sickafoose – Bass
 Jason Spiewak – A&R
 Mike Vizcarra – The man who now sits next to the right of God
 C.C. White – Vocals (background)
 Brian Wright – Mandolin
 Dave Yaden – Organ, Piano

References

2006 albums
Tony Lucca albums